R Sculptoris is a variable star system in the southern constellation of Sculptor. The star is drifting closer with a radial velocity of −5.4 km/s.

This is an aging giant star on the asymptotic giant branch with a stellar classification of C6,5ea(Np), which indicates a carbon-rich atmosphere. It is a semi-regular pulsating star of the SRb type that is nearing the end of its fusing lifespan. A sine curve fitted to the last ten pulsation cycles prior to 2017 give a pulsation period of 376 days with an amplitude of 0.75 magnitude. The star is shedding its outer atmosphere, and it is surrounded by a thin shell of dust and gas that was created during the most recent thermal pulse around 2,000 years ago.

Observations have revealed a spiral structure in the material around the star. The spiral is suspected to be caused by an unseen companion star. The spiral windings are consistent with an orbital period of ~350 years.

Gallery

References

Further reading
 

Carbon stars
Asymptotic-giant-branch stars
Semiregular variable stars
Binary stars

Sculptor (constellation)
Durchmusterung objects
008879
006759
0423
Sculptoris, R